The following is a list of equipment of the United States Army during World War II which includes artillery, vehicles and vessels. World War II was a global war that started in 1939 and ended in 1945. Following the Japanese attack of 7 December 1941, which led to the United States actively supporting the Allies' campaign.

Knives and bayonets

Small arms

Revolvers and pistols

Submachine guns

Rifles

Shotguns

Grenades

Recoilless rifles

Flamethrowers

Obstacle-clearing explosive charges

Machine guns

Artillery

Anti-tank weapons (besides anti-tank guns)
M1 Rocket Launcher (Bazooka)
Boys anti-tank rifle
M18 recoilless rifle
M20 recoilless rifle

Vehicles

Aircraft

United States Coast Guard
Consolidated PBY-5 Catalina amphibian flying boat	
Curtiss SOC-4 Seagull	floatplane	
Douglas RD-4 Dolphin amphibian flying boat
Fairchild J2K liaison		
Grumman JF-2 Duck	amphibian floatplane
Grumman J2F-4 Duck amphibian floatplane
Grumman JRF Goose amphibian flying boat			
Grumman J4F Widgeon amphibian flying boat	
Hall PH flying boat			
Lockheed XR3O-1	executive transport   
Lockheed R5O-1 Lodestar executive transport	
Naval Aircraft Factory N3N-3 trainer	
Vultee SNV trainer

United States Navy

r-Aeronca LNR observation/liaison/trainer
Beechcraft SNB Navigator trainer
Beechcraft JRB transport
Beechcraft GB Traveler transport
Bell XTDL Airacobra fighter
Bell XF2L Airacomet jet fighter
Boeing PB Flying Fortress heavy bomber
Boeing P2B Superfortress heavy bomber
Boeing 314 Clipper impressed flying boat transport
Boeing XF8B prototype carrier-based fighter-bomber
Boeing XPBB Sea Ranger flying boat/patrol bomber
Brewster F2A Buffalo carrier-based fighter
Brewster SBA/Naval Aircraft Factory SBN carrier-based scout bomber/trainer
Brewster SB2A Buccaneer carrier-based scout bomber
Budd RB-1 Conestoga transport
Cessna JRC transport
Consolidated PB4Y-1 Liberator patrol bomber
Consolidated PB4Y-2 Privateer patrol bomber
Consolidated PBY/PBN Catalina seaplane patrol bomber
Consolidated PB2Y Coronado flying boat/patrol bomber
Consolidated XP4Y Corregidor flying boat/patrol bomber
Culver TDC radio-controlled drone
Culver TD2C radio-controlled drone
Curtiss F11C Goshawk biplane fighter
Curtiss R5C Commando transport
Curtiss XF14C prototype carrier-based fighter
Curtiss SBC Helldiver carrier-based scout bomber
Curtiss SB2C Helldiver carrier-based dive bomber
Curtiss SOC Seagull observation aircraft
Curtiss SO3C Seamew observation aircraft
Curtiss SC Seahawk ASW aircraft
Curtiss SNC Falcon trainer
Douglas BD Havoc attack bomber
Douglas BTD Destroyer carrier-based torpedo bomber
Douglas A-26 Invader attack bomber
Douglas RD Dolphin amphibian flying boat transport
Douglas R2D transport
Douglas R3D transport
Douglas R4D transport
Douglas R5D transport
Douglas SBD Dauntless carrier-based dive bomber
Douglas TBD Devastator carrier-based torpedo bomber
Fairchild JK liaison
Fairchild J2K/GK liaison/trainer
Goodyear FG Corsair carrier-based fighter/bomber
General Motors FM Wildcat carrier-based fighter
Great Lakes BG target drone (withdrawn as carrier bomber)
Grumman F3F carrier-based fighter
Grumman F4F Wildcat carrier-based fighter
Grumman XF5F Skyrocket carrier-based prototype fighter
Grumman F6F Hellcat carrier-based fighter
Grumman F7F Tigercat carrier-based fighter
Grumman F8F Bearcat carrier-based fighter
Grumman JRF Goose flying boat
Grumman J4F Widgeon flying boat
Grumman JF Duck amphibian shipboard spotter
Grumman J2F Duck amphibian shipboard spotter
Grumman TBF/TBM Avenger carrier-based torpedo-bomber
Howard GH/NH Nightingale liaison/ambulance aircraft
Interstate TDR assault drone
Lockheed JO transport/gunnery trainer
Lockheed R2O Electra transport
Lockheed R5O Lodestar transport
Lockheed PBO patrol bomber
Lockheed PV-1 Ventura patrol bomber
Lockheed PV-2 Harpoon patrol bomber
Lockheed FO-1  fighter
Martin JM Marauder medium bomber
Martin JRM Mars transport flying boat
Martin M-130 impressed flying boat
Martin PBM Mariner flying boat
Martin PB2M Mars prototype patrol flying boat
Naval Aircraft Factory N3N trainer
Naval Aircraft Factory TDN assault drone
North American NJ-1 trainer
North American PBJ Mitchell medium/anti-ship bomber
North American SNJ trainer
North American ETF-51D fighter
Northrop BT-1 dive bomber
Piper LNP training glider
Piper NE observation/liaison aircraft
Pratt-Read LNE training glider
Ryan FR Fireball carrier-based mixed-propulsion fighter
Ryan NR Recruit trainer
Schweizer LNS training glider
Sikorsky HNS helicopter
Sikorsky HO2S helicopter
Sikorsky HO3S helicopter
Sikorsky JRS transport amphibian
Sikorsky JR2S impressed transport flying boat
Sikorsky XPBS-1 patrol flying boat
Stearman N2S trainer
Stinson OY Sentinel observation/liaison aircraft
Stinson R3Q trainer/utility aircraft
Spartan NP trainer
Taylorcraft LNT observation/liaison aircraft
Timm N2T Tutor trainer
Vought F4U Corsair carrier-based fighter
Vought O3U Corsair scout
Vought OS2U Kingfisher observation aircraft
Vought SBU carrier-based dive bomber
Vought SB2U Vindicator carrier-based dive bomber
Vought TBU Sea Wolf/Consolidated TBY Sea Wolf carrier-based torpedo-bomber
Vought V-173 experimental aircraft
Vultee SNV trainer
Waco LRW troop glider
Waco YKS-7 transport/liaison

United States Marine Corps
Allied Aviation XLRA glider
Brewster F2A Buffalo fighter
Vought F4U Corsair fighter/attack

Consolidated PB4Y-2 Privateer patrol bomber
Curtiss R5C Commando transport
Curtiss SBC Helldiver dive bomber
Curtiss SB2C Helldiver dive bomber
Douglas BD Havoc attack/medium bomber/target tug
Douglas RD Dolphin amphibian transport
Douglas R3D transport
Douglas R4D Skytrain transport
Douglas R5D Skymaster transport
Douglas SBD Dauntless dive bomber
Grumman F4F Wildcat fighter
Grumman F6F Hellcat fighter/night fighter
Grumman JRF Goose amphibian transport
Grumman TBF Avenger torpedo bomber
Lockheed JO-2 transport
Lockheed R5O Lodestar transport
Lockheed PV-1 Ventura patrol bomber
Martin JM Marauder attack/medium bomber/target tug
North American PBJ Mitchell attack/medium bomber
North American SNJ trainer
Northrop F2T Black Widow night fighter
Pratt-Read LNE training glider
Schweizer LNS training glider
Stinson OY Sentinel observation/liaison aircraft
Vought F4U Corsair "Fighter/night fighter"
Vought SB2U Vindicator dive bomber

United States Army Air Forces

Aeronca L-3 observation/liaison aircraft
Airspeed Oxford trainer
Avro AT-20 Anson trainer
Beechcraft XA-38 Grizzly prototype attack bomber
Beechcraft C-45 Expeditor transport/trainer
Beechcraft AT-10 Wichita advanced trainer
Bell YFM-1 Airacuda interceptor
Bell P-39 Airacobra fighter
Bell P-59 Airacomet jet fighter
Bell P-63 Kingcobra fighter
Bell XP-77 prototype lightweight fighter
Boeing P-26 Peashooter fighter
Boeing XB-15/XC-105 long-range bomber/transport
Boeing B-17 Flying Fortress heavy bomber
Boeing B-29 Superfortress heavy bomber
Boeing-Stearman PT-17 Kaydet primary trainer
Boulton Paul Defiant trainer/target tug
Brewster 339C/D Buffalo (ex-Dutch KNIL-ML) fighter
Bristol Beaufighter fighter
Budd C-93 Conestoga transport
Cessna AT-8/AT-17/UC-78 advanced trainer/light transport
Consolidated B-24 Liberator heavy bomber
Consolidated B-32 Dominator heavy bomber
Consolidated OA-10 Catalina Army PBY flying boat/patrol bomber
Consolidated Vultee XP-81 fighter
Vultee XA-41 prototype ground attack aircraft
Culver PQ-8/A-8 radio-controlled target aircraft
Culver PQ-14 Cadet radio-controlled target aircraft
Curtiss A-12 Shrike attack bomber
Curtiss XA-14/Curtiss A-18 Shrike attack bomber
Curtiss-Wright AT-9 Jeep advanced twin-engine pilot trainer
Curtiss-Wright C-46 Commando transport
Curtiss-Wright C-76 Caravan transport
Curtiss O-52 Owl observation aircraft
Curtiss P-36 Hawk fighter
Curtiss P-40 Warhawk/Kittyhawk/Tomahawk fighter
Curtiss XP-46 prototype fighter
Curtiss-Wright XP-55 Ascender prototype fighter
Curtiss YP-60 fighter
Curtiss XP-62 prototype fighter
Curtiss A-25 Shrike Army SB2C dive bomber
de Havilland F-8 Mosquito reconnaissance aircraft
Douglas A-20 Havoc attack bomber
Douglas A-26 Invader attack bomber
Douglas XA/XB-42 Mixmaster prototype bomber
Douglas B-18 Bolo ASW/medium bomber
Douglas XBLR-2/XB-19 prototype heavy bomber
Douglas B-23 Dragon medium bomber
Douglas C-32 transport
Douglas C-47 Skytrain transport
Douglas C-54 Skymaster transport
Douglas C-110 (ex-Dutch Douglas DC-5) transport
Douglas O-31 observation aircraft
Douglas O-43 observation aircraft
Douglas O-46 observation aircraft
Douglas A-24 Dauntless Army SBD dive bomber
Grumman OA-9 Goose Army JRF flying boat
Grumman OA-14 Widgeon Army J4F patrol aircraft
Fairchild UC-61/86 Argus liaison aircraft/trainer
Fairchild AT-21 Gunner advanced/gunnery trainer
Fairchild PT-19/23/23 primary trainer
Federal AT-20 - Ansons purchased for Lend-Lease as bomber trainer
Fisher XP-75 Eagle prototype fighter
Fleetwings BT-12 basic trainer
Howard UC-70 Nightingale liaison aircraft
Interstate L-6 Grasshopper observation/liaison aircraft
Lockheed UC-101 Vega executive transport
Lockheed UC-85 Orion executive transport
Lockheed C-36/Model 10 Electra transport
Lockheed C-40/Model 12 Electra Junior transport/gunnery trainer
Lockheed C-56/C-57/C-59/C-60/C-66/C-104 Lodestar transport
Lockheed A-29 Hudson patrol bomber
Lockheed C-69 Constellation transport
Lockheed B-34/B-37 Lexington medium bomber
Lockheed P-38 Lightning fighter
Lockheed P-80 Shooting Star jet fighter
Martin A-30 Baltimore Lend-lease attack bomber
Martin B-10/Martin B-12 medium bombers
Martin B-26 Marauder medium bomber
McDonnell XP-67 prototype fighter
Noorduyn C-64 Norseman transport
North American A-36 Invader/Apache dive bomber/attack aircraft
North American B-25 Mitchell medium bomber
North American XB-28 prototype medium bomber
North American BT-9 basic trainer
North American BT-14 basic trainer
North American BC-1 basic combat trainer
North American AT-6 Texan advanced trainer
North American O-47 observation aircraft
North American P-51 Mustang fighter
North American P-64 fighter/advanced trainer
North American P-82 Twin Mustang
Northrop A-13/A-16/A-17/A-33 attack aircraft
Northrop XP-56 Black Bullet prototype fighter
Northrop P-61 Black Widow night fighter
Northrop XP-79 prototype interceptor
Piper L-4 Grasshopper observation/liaison aircraft
Republic P-43 Lancer fighter
Republic P-47 Thunderbolt fighter
Republic XP-72 prototype fighter
Ryan PT-16/PT-22 Recruit primary trainer
St. Louis YPT-15 primary trainer
Seversky AT-12 Guardsman advanced trainer
Seversky BT-8 basic trainer
Seversky P-35 fighter
Sikorsky R-4 & R-6 Hoverfly helicopters
Sikorsky R-5 helicopter
Stinson UC-81/AT-19 Reliant trainer
Stinson O-49/L-1 Vigilant observation/liaison aircraft
Stinson O-62/L-5 Sentinel liaison aircraft
Supermarine Spitfire fighter/reconnaissance
Taylorcraft O-57/L-2 Grasshopper observation/liaison aircraft
Vultee A-31/A-35 Vengeance dive bomber
Vultee BT-13/BT-15 Valiant basic trainer
Vultee XP-54 prototype fighter
Vultee P-66 Vanguard fighter
Waco CG-3 troop glider
Waco CG-4 troop glider
Waco PT-14 primary trainer
Westland Lysander liaison

Captured

Ship

Secret weaponry

Manhattan Project, created the first nuclear weapon

Uniforms

Headgear
Campaign hat
Garrison cap
M1 helmet
M1C helmet
Patrol cap
Pith helmet
Utility cover
Leather flying helmet
M2 helmet
M38 Tanker helmet

Boots
M43 combat boot
Jungle boot
Jump boot

Other clothing

U.S. Army M1943 uniform
M1941 Field Jacket

Radars

Missiles and bombs
ASM-N-2 Bat
Azon (bomb)
Fat Man (nuclear bomb)
GB-4
LBD Gargoyle
Little Boy (nuclear bomb)
M47 bomb
Mark 65 bomb
Pelican (bomb)
Pumpkin bomb
Thin Man (nuclear bomb)
VB-6 Felix

References

 
United States Army World War II
Equipment